Laminated paper may refer to:
Plastic-coated paper
Lamination paper